Pavel Řeřábek (born 21 May 1952) is a Czech volleyball player. He competed at the 1976 Summer Olympics and the 1980 Summer Olympics.

References

1952 births
Living people
Czech men's volleyball players
Olympic volleyball players of Czechoslovakia
Volleyball players at the 1976 Summer Olympics
Volleyball players at the 1980 Summer Olympics
Sportspeople from Prague